House-Museum of Jalil Mammadguluzada is a museum opened in Tbilisi on 11 October 1997. Jalil Mammadguluzada lived and worked in this house (1897-1918). During 1906-1911, he published the magazine Molla Nasraddin.

The museum contains documents and photographs reflecting the writers' activities in Tbilisi, posters of the featured films based on his works, the copies of Molla Nasraddin. The Geyrat printing house, which printed the magazine, was located in the basement of the building. 

The museum is located on the first floor of a two-story building, which is over 200 years old. At one time, both floors of the building belonged to Mammadguluzada. After the Soviet occupation, tenants were settled in the building and only a two-room apartment on the ground floor was preserved as a house-museum. The museum fell into disrepair.

See also 
 Jalil Mammadguluzadeh
 House-Museum of Jalil Mammadguluzadeh (Baku)
 House-Museum of Jalil Mammadguluzadeh (Nakhchivan)

References 

Museums established in 1997 
Museums in Tbilisi